Fanny by Gaslight (US title – Man of Evil) is a 1944 British drama film, directed by Anthony Asquith and produced by Gainsborough Pictures, set in the 1870s and adapted from a 1940 novel by Michael Sadleir (also adapted as a 1981 TV serial).

It was the second of its famous period-set "Gainsborough melodramas", following The Man in Grey (1943).  Its US release was delayed for its breaking the Hays Purity Code and 17 minutes were removed.

Stewart Granger later said he "didn't like" the film because of its "drippy characters" but thought "Asquith was much the best of those directors I worked with at Gainsborough."

Plot

The story unfolds in Victorian London. Fanny is only 9 years old and is in the street with her young friend. They wander down to a basement, which appears to be a brothel and nightclub (Hopwood Shades). She is given a coin and then pulled out by Joe, her father's handyman. Back at home she is having a birthday party by her father (John Laurie). Her mother and father decide to send her away to boarding school.

We jump to her birthday in 1880, Fanny has finished at boarding school and returns to London. It is clearer that her father owns and runs the nearby nightclub and brothel and has a secret door in his house that links down to it, But he has no desire for his daughter to be involved in any way with the business. Only when her father is killed in a fight with Lord Manderstoke, is it revealed to her at the inquest that her father ran a brothel.

She is sent to work for the Heaviside/Seymore family far from her home. The husband Clive Seymore reveals he is her true father and he paid William Hopwood to look after her (it is implied he was a client). She is introduced to other servants as Mrs Heaviside's niece and given the name Emily Hooper. Her father takes her on holiday and gets to know her and wants to tell the world that she is his daughter.

In the idyllic countryside during the holiday she is painting by the lake when a dog spoils her picture. The dog belongs to Harry Somerford. They chat.

Back in the mansion where they stay the dog appears at her door. She looks out of the window and Harry is talking business with her father. He is a young friend of the father, who then has to return to London without her. She is now calling him "father".

Back at the huge Seymore house she returns to duties as a maid. One day a visitor Lord Manderstoke encounters her on the stair and recognises her as Hopwood's daughter. He is revealed as the lover of Mrs Seymore.

Mr Seymore reveals to his wife that Fanny is his daughter. She asks for a divorce to marry Manderstoke. Mr Seymore commits suicide rather than face disgrace.

Fanny leaves and goes back to home territory. Somerford is trustee to Mr Seymore's will and delivers property shares to Fanny. A letter reveals that Fanny was Seymore's daughter and also that he loved Somerford like a son.

Somerford's sister comes and tells her Somerford wants to marry her but it must not happen as it will ruin his reputation. Somerford appears and asks her to marry him.

In the final scene Somerford has been shot in the chest and Fanny and a physician are caring for him. The sister again appears and demands to take him into her own care. This could be fatal but the sister says she would rather he die than be with Fanny. He chooses to live.

Cast
 Phyllis Calvert as Fanny Hopwood/Fanny Hooper
 James Mason as Lord Manderstoke 
 Wilfrid Lawson as Chunks 
 Stewart Granger as Harry Somerford 
 Jean Kent as Lucy Beckett 
 Margaretta Scott as Alicia Seymore
 Nora Swinburne as Mrs. Hopwood 
 Cathleen Nesbitt as Kate Somerford 
 Helen Haye as Mrs. Somerford 
 John Laurie as William Hopwood 
 Stuart Lindsell as Clive Seymore 
 Amy Veness as Mrs. Heaviside 
 Ann Wilton as Miss Carver
 Esma Cannon as Gossiping Maid (uncredited)
 Shelagh Fraser as Maid (uncredited)
 Ann Stephens as Fanny as a child 
 John Turnbull as Magistrate  
 Cyril Smith as Publican  
 Helen Goss as Polly
 Johnnie Schofield as Joe Fox ("Jugs")
 Vi Kaley as Joe's wife

Production
The film was based on a novel published in 1940.

Phyllis Calvert and Anthony Asquith were attached to the project by October 1942.

The film's release in the US was delayed over three years due to American censor concerns over scenes set in a brothel.

Jean Kent played a Margaret Lockwood style role.

Reception
According to Kinematograph Weekly the 'biggest winners' at the box office in 1944 Britain were For Whom the Bell Tolls, This Happy Breed, Song of Bernadette, Going My Way, This Is the Army, Jane Eyre, The Story of Dr Wassell, Cover Girl, White Cliffs of Dover, Sweet Rosie O'Grady and Fanny By Gaslight. The biggest British hits of the year were, in order, Breed, Fanny By Gaslight, The Way Ahead and Love Story. However, it performed very badly at the box office in the US.

Analysis
The film deals with themes of illegitimacy, social class, blackmail, and duelling.

References

Bibliography
 MacFarlane, B. (1997) An Autobiography of British Cinema, Methuen. .
 Reeves, N. (2003) The power of film propaganda: myth or reality?, Continuum: London. .

External links
 

Fanny by Gaslight at TCMDB
Fanny By Gaslight at BFI Screenonline
Review of film at Variety

1944 films
British black-and-white films
Melodrama films
Gainsborough Pictures films
Films based on British novels
Films set in the 1850s
Films set in the 1860s
Films set in the 1870s
Films set in 1880
Films set in Paris
Films set in London
British historical drama films
1940s historical drama films
Films directed by Anthony Asquith
Islington Studios films
1944 drama films
1940s English-language films
1940s British films